Shizu is a Chinese term meaning ancestor or founder. It may also refer to:

Posthumously named "Shìzǔ" (世祖) 

 Kublai Khan (Emperor Shizu of Yuan)
 Shunzhi Emperor (Emperor Shizu of Qing)
 Wanyan Helibo (Emperor Shizu of Jin)
 Cao Pi (Emperor Shizu of [Cao] Wei)
 Emperor Xiaowu of Liu Song (Emperor Shizu of [Liu] Song)
 Emperor Wu of Southern Qi (Emperor Shizu of Southern Qi)
 Emperor Wucheng of Northern Qi (Emperor Shizu of Northern Qi)
 Emperor Wen of Chen (Emperor  Shizu of Chen)
 Liu Chong (Emperor Shizu of Northern Han)
 Helian Bobo (Emperor Shizu of [Northern] Xia)
 Murong Chui (Emperor Shizu of [Later] Yan)
 Sejo of Joseon (King Shizu of Joseon [dynasty of Korea])

Posthumously named "Shǐzǔ" (始祖) 

 Tai Si (King Shizu of Xia)
 King Wen of Zhou (King Shizu of Zhou)
 Li Te (Emperor Shizu of Cheng Han)

Given name
, Japanese author
, American visual artist

Fictional characters
 Shizu, a character from Shin Megami Tensei: Devil Summoner: Raidou Kuzunoha vs. The Soulless Army
 Shizu (シズ), a character from the video game Suikoden III
 Shizu Shidō (祇堂 静珠), a character from Maria Holic
 Princess Shizu, a character from Legend of the Eight Samurai
 Princess Shizu, a character from Shogun Iemitsu Shinobi Tabi

Other uses 

  ( or ), is a special class in Chinese history

 Shizu Station (disambiguation) (しづ , シズ), several train stations in Japan
 Shizu Station (Chiba) (志津駅)
 Shizu Station (Ibaraki) (静駅)

See also 
 Shizuka (disambiguation)
 Shizuko (静子), a feminine Japanese given name

Temple name disambiguation pages
Japanese unisex given names